The Suleymaniye Mosque or the Mosque of Suleiman was a mosque originally built after the Ottoman conquest of Rhodes in 1522 and reconstructed in 1808. It was named by the Sultan Suleiman to commemorate his conquest of Rhodes.

History 
This mosque was the first mosque in the town of Rhodes, built soon after Ottomans besieged it and captured it in 1522. In 1808 the current building of mosque was built through the reconstruction of this first mosque. Its plaster is rose-pink. The most of the mosque was reconstructed using materials of the buildings which existed at the same place in the earlier period. The pillars of the outer arcade belonged to the Christian church.

Europa Nostra gave this mosque an honorary distinction in 2006. It currently serves as a museum.

Gallery

References

External links 
 

Ottoman mosques in Greece
16th-century mosques
Buildings and structures in Rhodes (city)
16th-century architecture in Greece
Former mosques in Greece
Museums in Rhodes
Mosque buildings with domes
Ottoman architecture in Rhodes